Sir Sydney Sunderland CMG (1910–1993) was an eminent Australian scientist in the field of medicine, and was a Foundation Fellow of the Australian Academy of Science.  He was educated at Scotch College, Melbourne and Brisbane State High School, and the University of Queensland. He was Dean of Medicine at the University of Melbourne.

Personal life
Sir Sydney Sunderland was the son of Rugby League administrator and journalist Harry Sunderland.

Honours
Sunderland was appointed a Companion of the Order of St Michael and St George in 1961.  He was knighted in 1971.

References

Fellows of the Australian Academy of Science
1910 births
1993 deaths
Australian Companions of the Order of St Michael and St George
Australian Knights Bachelor